Melbourne's Living Museum of the West is an ecomuseum and community social history museum in Melbourne's western suburb of Maribyrnong. It was established as part of Victoria's sesquicentenary (150 year anniversary) in 1984, along with the Children's Museum and the Museum of Chinese Australian History.

Origin and philosophy
Generally referred to as the Living Museum of the West, or just the Living Museum, it was established in 1984, specifically to address the perceived disadvantage of Melbourne's Western Region, which as well as being generally a working class, industrial area, was considered to lack many cultural facilities. The ecomuseum concept was adopted to focus on the environment, landscape and people and their culture, and to involve the community in recording and preserving their own stories.

Described as "Australia's first ecomuseum, the museum focusses on the stories of people of Melbourne's Western Region, extending from Footscray to Bacchus Marsh, and from Sunbury to Werribee. Initially intended to be a museum without walls and focussing on oral history recording and community participation, it did not have a tradition objects collection until more recently.

Collection
The Living Museum maintains a Resources Collection which includes over 10,000 documents, photographs, tapes and artefacts which form the Resource Centre, as well as the personnel and facilities at the Museum itself. The collections include published books, reports and articles; maps, plans and drawings; a photographic archive; oral histories; and exhibition materials. It contains about 500 artefacts, 5000 archival records (primarily copies of documents and plans), 10,000 photographic images (both copies of historical photographs and contemporary photos documenting the region and museum activities). Its most significant core collection is the oral history recordings, which focusses on the "themes of migration, work, environment, culture, heritage, industry, women in the community and the everyday stories of the people of Melbourne's West".

Location
From its beginnings in Footscray, the Living Museum expanded its collection and staff to outgrow the small premises, and with assistance from Arts Victoria, which provided core funding from its establishment, it moved to a refurbished industrial site. The Living Museum is now housed in the former industrial buildings at Pipemakers Park Van Ness Avenue, Maribyrnong, which were refurbished under a $2 million Australian Bicentenary grant in 1987–88, and are owned by Parks Victoria, with a lease arrangement with the Living Museum. The venue includes a visitor and research centre with staff offices, and large exhibition space in converted bluestone industrial buildings. These have been used for a variety of exhibitions, concerts, performances and community events.

The Museum's Patron is former Victorian premier Joan Kirner.

The Living Museum of the West commenced operations in a small house in David Street Footscray, with a staff of 4 and a much larger number of people employed under job creation schemes, who undertook research, oral history recording and preparation of exhibitions.

Recent events
In 2011 the Living Museum went into decline, having lost its recurrent core funding from Arts Victoria, and struggled to secure replacement income. For a time it was dominated by a group of local artists known as MREAM (Maribyrnong River Edge Art Movement, who wished to develop the Pipemakers Park as artists studios and exhibition space, but were subsequently outvoted in 2011.

In 2012 the Living Museum re-established the collection in the Visitor Centre in Pipemakers Park. The Museum is currently in the process of digitising the collection and presenting and publishing the archives on the internet. With a new and dynamic committee of management, that includes original and new members, the Living Museum continues to develop programs of exhibitions and events in the historic buildings along the Maribyrnong River.

See also
Ecomuseum
Industrial archaeology

References

External links
Living Museum website

Ecomuseums
Museums established in 1984
Museums in Melbourne
History museums in Australia
1984 establishments in Australia
Buildings and structures in the City of Maribyrnong
Maribyrnong, Victoria